Ross William Halfin (born 11 August 1957) is a British rock and roll photographer. Since the late 1970s he has worked for some of the biggest acts in rock and heavy metal, including Led Zeppelin, AC/DC, Black Sabbath, The Who, Kiss, Metallica, Iron Maiden, Judas Priest, Van Halen, Def Leppard and many others.

Early life 

Halfin was born in London, and originally wanted to be an artist when he grew up. He attended the Wimbledon School of Art in the 1970s where he studied painting. Around the same time he started bringing his camera along to rock concerts, which he could do with no restrictions at the time. He later claimed he became a rock photographer by accident.

Career 

Halfin began his career working for Sounds magazine in the 1970s, shooting various artists on the punk scene including The Clash, The Jam, The Sex Pistols, 999 and The Adverts. After linking up with writers Geoff Barton and Peter Makowski, Halfin moved on to working mainly in the US with bands such as AC/DC, UFO, Rush, Journey, Aerosmith and Black Sabbath.  In 1981 he started working with the new magazine Kerrang!, photographing their first cover and shooting with them for the next 20 years.

In the 1990s, Halfin took to travel photography on a casual but obscure basis, but his work would later resurface in an issue of Genesis Publications in 2011.

He has toured with many bands, including Metallica, Iron Maiden, Status Quo, Def Leppard, Mötley Crüe, Van Halen, Aerosmith, The Black Crowes, Ozzy Osbourne, Kiss, Soundgarden, Queens of the Stone Age and The Mars Volta.

Exhibitions 

 The Age of Rock, 2015, Flo Peters Gallery, Hamburg, Germany
 The Ultimate Metallica, 2010, Blender Gallery, Sydney, Australia
 Made of Metal, 2005, Proud Galleries, London, England

Books 
 Metallica: The Black Album in Black & White, 2021
 Sojourner: Ross Halfin Travels, 2011, Genesis Publications
 Iron Maiden, 2008, Vision On Publishing

References

External links
 
 SuicideGirls Ross Halfin Interview By Garrett Faber
 'Sojourner Ross Halfin Travels' - publishers site

1957 births
Living people
Photographers from London
Rock music photographers
Place of birth missing (living people)